Oshumare is an album by American jazz drummer Billy Hart recorded in 1985 and released on the Gramavision label.

Reception

The Allmusic review by Alex Henderson states, "Oshumare makes listeners wish that Hart had recorded more albums as a leader in the 1980s".

Track listing
All compositions by Billy Hart except as indicated
 "Duchess" - 6:14  
 "Waiting Inside" (Bill Frisell) - 7:46  
 "Chance" (Kenny Kirkland) - 5:54  
 "Lorca" - 7:30  
 "Cosmosis" (Dave Holland) - 4:42  
 "IDGAF Suite" (Kevin Eubanks) - 10:18  
 "May Dance" (Holland) - 6:07 Bonus track on CD 
 "Mad Monkey" (Steve Coleman) - 6:15 Bonus track on CD

Personnel
Billy Hart - drums
Steve Coleman - alto saxophone 
Branford Marsalis - tenor saxophone 
Bill Frisell, Kevin Eubanks - electric guitar  
Mark Gray, Kenny Kirkland - keyboards  
Didier Lockwood - violin
Dave Holland - bass
Manolo Badrena - percussion

References

1985 albums
Billy Hart albums
Gramavision Records albums